This is a list of newspapers in Samoa.

Savali
Le Samoa
Samoa Observer
Samoa Times
Samoanische Zeitung
Talamua Magazine

See also
List of newspapers

References

Samoa
Newspapers